Grant Hildebrand (born 1934) is an American architect and architectural historian who is Professor Emeritus in the Department of Architecture in the College of Built Environments at the University of Washington in Seattle.

Hildebrand earned his Bachelor of Architecture degree from the University of Michigan in 1957 and subsequently worked for the offices of Albert Kahn and Minoru Yamasaki.  After completing his Master of Architecture at the University of Michigan in 1964, he joined the faculty of the Department of Architecture at the University of Washington, where he taught until the year 2000.   At Washington, Hildebrand taught architectural design, architectural history, and a variety of other classes.  He received the University's Distinguished Teaching Award in 1975.  In 1978 he became interested in the work of the English geographer Jay Appleton, who developed a theory about the innate appeal of certain landscapes.  Hildebrand applied these ideas to architectural space, teaching a course on this topic beginning in 1988.

Hildebrand's early research and writing drew on his time with the firm of Albert Kahn, leading to Designing for Industry: The Architecture of Albert Kahn (1974).  Hildebrand's interest in the work of Jay Appleton is reflected in two books, The Wright Space: Pattern and Meaning in Frank Lloyd Wright's Houses (1991) and  Origins of Architectural Pleasure (1999) which received the Washington Governor's Writers' Award.  Hildebrand's recent publications have focused on architecture and design by his friends and colleagues, including books on the houses of Wendell Lovett and Arne Bystrom, designs by Phillip Jacobson, and architecture by Gene Zema, by George Suyama, and by Gordon Walker.

Books
 Designing for Industry: The Architecture of Albert Kahn, MIT Press, Cambridge MA, 1974
 The Wright Space: Pattern and Meaning in Frank Lloyd Wright's Houses, University of Washington Press, Seattle and London, 1991. 
 Origins of Architectural Pleasure, University of California Press, Berkeley and London, 1999. 
 with T. William Booth, A Thriving Modernism; The Houses of Wendell Lovett and Arne Bystrom, University of Washington Press, Seattle and London, 2004. 
 with Ann and Leonard K. Eaton, Frank Lloyd Wright's Palmer House, University of Washington Press, Seattle and London, 2007. 
 Elegant Explorations: The Designs of Phillip Jacobson, University of Washington Press, Seattle and London, 2007.   
 with Miriam Sutermeister, A Greek Temple in French Prairie, c Marion Dean Ross Chapter, Society of Architectural Historians, self-published for regional libraries, 2007
 Suyama: A Complex Serenity, Marquand Books with University of Washington Press, Seattle and London, 2011.  
 Gene Zema, Architect, Craftsman, University of Washington Press, Seattle and London, 2012.  
 Little Wooden Buildings: the Puget Sound School, c Marion Dean Ross Chapter, Society of Architectural Historians, self-published for regional libraries, 2014
 Gordon Walker, a Poetic Architecture, Arcade, Lucia/Marquand, and University of Washington Press, Seattle and London, 2019

Videos

UWTV Classics, "Upon Reflection: Art, Architecture and the Pacific Northwest," Grant Hildebrand (TV interview), 1988

References

External links
 University of Washington Department of Architecture faculty profile

Living people
American architecture writers
American architectural historians
American biographers
American male biographers
Taubman College of Architecture and Urban Planning alumni
University of Washington faculty
Writers from Seattle
1934 births